Beijing Paralympics may refer to:
 2008 Summer Paralympics, in Beijing, China
 2022 Winter Paralympics, in Beijing, China

See also 
 Beijing Olympics (disambiguation)
 Beijing (disambiguation)